Anton "Antoine" Raab (16 July 1913 – 12 December 2006) was a German football player and manager. Raab spent most of his career in France after having escaped Nazi Germany, being prosecuted and incarcerated for refusing to give the Nazi salute at a football game.

Biography
Raab, born in Frankfurt, Hesse, was one of four children of a German First World War veteran. His father, through his own experience during the war, raised Raab a pacifist and Christian and the latter held a strong conviction against any form of killing. Raab turned from his Christian faith however when, as a 19-year-old, he saw a priest bless a submarine in Hamburg.

A promising young player for Eintracht Frankfurt, Raab was selected to captain a German youth side in a game in Stuttgart where he refused to give the Nazi salute. He was not immediately prosecuted because of his status as a youth international, but was monitored by the police, and arrested 18 months later. Raab was detained and tortured for the next 11 months and eventually sentenced to 15 years of hard labour. Imprisoned in the fortress of Kassel, Raab contemplated suicide but was talked out of it by one of the guards. Raab fabricated a key, escaped and found shelter with a woman whose husband had been shot and killed by the Nazis. With the help of his brother, Raab escaped Germany for France on 1 May 1937, dressed in a SS uniform.

Unable to speak French and without any money Raab received help from local people and eventually made his way to Paris where he was recognised as former German youth international and, despite opposition from Germany, signed for CA Paris. Raab moved to Nantes for work reasons in 1938 but had to give up his post as a draftsman after the outbreak of the Second World War because of the company being involved in national defence contracts. He was eventually arrested because of his German nationality and sent to work in an ammunition factory until shortly before the armistice in 1940 when he escaped from the advancing German Army. During the German occupation of France Raab avoided arrest by the Germans and wrote pacifist leaflets which he distributed to German soldiers, hiding for a time in the village of Treillières.

After the liberation of Nantes in 1944 Raab joined FC Nantes and played for the club until 1949. He also had two stints as manager of FC Nantes as well as becoming the club's director of sports for a time. He became a critic of the money involved in professional football when, at the same time, there was so much suffering and poverty in the world. Raab died on 12 December 2006 in Nantes.

References

1913 births
2006 deaths
German anti-fascists
German footballers
German torture victims
German escapees
Association football defenders
Escapees from German detention
German people imprisoned abroad
Prisoners and detainees of France
World War II civilian prisoners
German expatriate footballers
Expatriate footballers in France
German expatriate football managers
Expatriate football managers in France
German expatriate sportspeople in France
Footballers from Frankfurt
Eintracht Frankfurt players
CA Paris-Charenton players
Stade Rennais F.C. players
FC Nantes players
Stade Lavallois players
FC Nantes managers